</noinclude>
Baviaanskloof Wilderness Areas is the name of a protected area in Eastern Cape, South Africa. It is a 174 400 hectare conservation area  recognised in 2004 as a World Heritage Site.  The word, Baviaanskloof, is derived from the Dutch for "valley of baboons".

References

Protected areas of the Eastern Cape